The Sabah partridge (Tropicoperdix graydoni) is a bird species in the family Phasianidae. It is found in Borneo.

References

Tropicoperdix
Birds of Malaysia
Birds of Indonesia
Birds described in 1906
Taxa named by Richard Bowdler Sharpe